Progress M-48, identified by NASA as Progress 12P, was a Progress spacecraft used to resupply the International Space Station. It was a Progress-M 11F615A55 spacecraft, with the serial number 248.

Launch
Progress M-48 was launched by a Soyuz-U carrier rocket from Site 1/5 at the Baikonur Cosmodrome. Launch occurred at 01:47:59 UTC on 29 August 2003.

Docking
The spacecraft docked with the aft port of the Zvezda module at 03:40:45 UTC on 31 August. It remained docked for 150 days before undocking at 08:35:56 UTC on 28 January 2004 to make way for Progress M1-11. It was deorbited at 13:11 UTC on the same day. The spacecraft burned up in the atmosphere over the Pacific Ocean, with any remaining debris landing in the ocean at around 13:57:12 UTC.

Progress M-48 carried supplies to the International Space Station, including food, water and oxygen for the crew and equipment for conducting scientific research.

See also

 List of Progress flights
 Uncrewed spaceflights to the International Space Station

References

Spacecraft launched in 2003
Progress (spacecraft) missions
Spacecraft which reentered in 2004
Supply vehicles for the International Space Station
Spacecraft launched by Soyuz-U rockets